Ethmia charybdis is a moth in the family Depressariidae. It is found in California, United States.

The ground color of the forewings is gray, heavily overlaid with whitish, especially on the dorsal half. The ground color of the hindwings is pale gray.

References

Moths described in 1973
charybdis